Xingfu Temple may refer to:

 Wuying Pagoda, a Chinese pagoda at Xingfu Temple in Wuchang, Hubei, China
 Xingfu Temple (Changshu), in Changshu, Jiangsu, China

Buddhist temple disambiguation pages